"I Feel the Magic" is the second single from Belinda Carlisle's debut album as a solo singer, entitled Belinda, and released in 1986. The song, having a typical Motown 1960s pop soul feel, was a minor hit, reaching #82 on the U.S. Billboard Hot 100.

'Agree Shampoo' used the song in their commercials.

Music video
The music video was directed by Marty Callner.

Charts

References

External links
Belinda Carlisle 1986 singles at BelindaVault

1986 singles
1986 songs
Belinda Carlisle songs
Songs written by Charlotte Caffey
Song recordings produced by Michael Lloyd
Music videos directed by Marty Callner
MCA Records singles
Virgin Records singles